The women's competition in the bantamweight (– 53 kg) division was held on 6 November 2011.

Schedule

Medalists

Records

Results

New records

References

(Pages 26, 28 & 30) Start List 
2011 IWF World Championships Results Book Pages 11–13 
Results

2011 World Weightlifting Championships
World